Monodontides argioloides is a butterfly of the family Lycaenidae. It is found in New Guinea.

References

, 1971. Butterflies of the Australian Region, edn 1. 415 pp. Melbourne.
, 1978. Butterflies of the Australian Region, edn 2. 415 pp. Melbourne.
 , 1983. Blue butterflies of the Lycaenopsis group: 1-309, 6 pls. London
, 1917. Revision der Lycaenidengattung Lycaenopsis. Arch. Naturgesch. 82 (A) (1) (1916): 1-42, 2 pls.
, 1927b-1928: Eine Revision der javanischen, zu Lycaenopsis und verwandten Genera gehörigen Arten. Tijdschr. Ent. 70: 232-302, 1pl., 27 figs; ibid. 71: 179-265, 1 pl., 29 figs.

Monodontides
Butterflies described in 1915